Archidium elatum is a species of moss in the family Archidiaceae. It is native to New Zealand, where it occurs on the North Island and Chatham Island, and Australia, where it can be found in Queensland and New South Wales.

This moss grows on wet basalt and other coastal rock formations. In some areas it is associated with Campylopus introflexus, Ceratodon purpureus, Disphyma australe, and Astelia banksii.

This moss was thought to be endemic to New Zealand but it has recently been found in Australia. In New Zealand it is listed as a 'Nationally Vulnerable' species under the New Zealand Threat Classification System.

References

Bryopsida
Bryophyta of New Zealand
Bryophyta of Australia
Taxonomy articles created by Polbot